Harriet Bloch (1881-1975) was a Danish screenwriter who worked in the industry during the silent era. During her career, she wrote over 100 screenplays, some of which were never produced. Her scripts were made into films in Denmark, Germany, Sweden, and beyond.

Selected filmography 

 1923 Tatjana
 1923 Republikaneren 
 1921 Die Erbin von Tordis 
 1920 Kærlighed og Overtro (Short) 
 1920 En hustru till låns (Short) 
 1920 Frøken Larsens Karriere (Short) 
 1918 Frøken Theodor (Short) 
 1918 Hendes Hjertes Ridder 
 1918 Præstens Datter 
 1918 Hjerterkonge (Short) 
 1918 Prøvens Dag 
 1918 Pigespejderen (Short) 
 1918 Den lille Virtuos (Short) 
 1917 De tossede Kvindfolk (Short) 
 1917 Et barnehjerte 
 1917 The Suburban Vicar 
 1917 Miljonarvet (Short) 
 1917 Tropernes Datter 
 1917 Askepot (Short) 
 1917 Kærligheds-Væddemaalet 
 1916 For sin faders skyld 
 1916 Danserindens hævn 
 1916 Manden uden fremtid 
 1916 Kärlek och journalistik (Short) 
 1916 Prinsessens Hjerte 
 1916 Letsindighedens Løn 
 1916 En kærlighedsprøve 
 1916 Hendes fortid 
 1916 Viljeløs Kærlighed 
 1916 Ålderdom och dårskap (Short) 
 1915 A Woman's Honor 
 1915 Den lille Chauffør (Short) 
 1915 Et huskors 
 1915 En søvnig Brudgom (Short) 
 1915 Lige for lige (Short) 
 1915 Den sidste Nat 
 1915 De Ægtemænd! 
 1915 Badehotellet 
 1914 Man skal ikke skue Hunden paa Haarene (Short) 
 1914 Et Læreaar 
 1914 Hægt mig i Ryggen (Short) 
 1914 En stærkere magt 
 1914 Den store Middag (Short) 
 1914 Under falsk Flag (Short) 
 1913 Livets blændværk (Short) (writer) 
 1913 Nelly's Forlovelse 
 1913 The Girl Graduate (Short) 
 1913 Et skud i mørket (Short) 
 1913 Outwitted (Short) (writer) 
 1912 Pro forma (Short) 
 1912 When Love Dies 
 1911 Hendes Ære (Short) 
 1911 Thru Trials to Victory

References 

1881 births
1975 deaths
Danish women screenwriters
20th-century screenwriters
Women film pioneers